Howard Emmett Lepper (February 19, 1898 – December 1, 1985) was a professional football player, as well as the manager, for the Buffalo All-Americans. Aside from playing football in Buffalo, Lepper also helped start the team in 1917, when they were called the Buffalo All-Stars, Niagaras and Prospects. All of the early press announcements regarding the Buffalo team, referred to Lepper as the team's manager. Around 1917, Lepper and Frank McNeil signed a lease for the team to play their home games at Canisius College.

In 1920 the Buffalo All-Americans started their season 7-0. this gave Lepper the best start for a rookie head coach in NFL history. His record was kept intact until 1931, when Potsy Clark of the Portsmouth Spartans broke the record with an 8-0 start. However. Barney kept his second-best start stat until November 1, 2009, when rookie coach Jim Caldwell of the Indianapolis Colts tied his record. A week later Caldwell tied Clark's record, giving Lepper now the third-best start by a rookie coach in the NFL.

Prior to his professional career, Lepper played football at the high school level for Lafayette High School. There he starred at tackle and place kicker leading the team to consecutive City Championships in 1914 and 1915.

Head coaching record

References

Postgame Notes: 49ers-Colts

1898 births
1985 deaths
American football tackles
Buffalo All-Americans players
Players of American football from Buffalo, New York